Ameenpur is a satellite town of Hyderabad in Patancheru mandal of Sangareddy district in the Indian state of Telangana. The locality is famous for the scenic Ameenpur Lake.

Ameenpur has become a popular residential area in Hyderabad Metropolitan Region, owing to its close proximity to areas such as Miyapur and HITEC City in the real estate boom of early 2000s. The area however, suffers due to lack of proper civic amenities.

References

Cities and towns in Sangareddy district
Neighbourhoods in Hyderabad, India